The following lists events that happened during 1835 in Chile.

Incumbents
President of Chile: José Joaquín Prieto

Events

February
20 February - 1835 Concepción earthquake

Births
9 June - Ramón Barros Luco (d. 1919)
24 October - Vicente Reyes (d. 1918)

Deaths

References 

 
1830s in Chile
Chile
Chile